Tim Hanshaw (born April 27, 1970) was an American football Guard  who played for the San Francisco 49ers of the National Football League (NFL). He was signed by the 49ers as a 4th round pick in the 1995 NFL Draft.

Early years 
Hanshaw was born in 1970 to Robert and Rosette Hanshaw in Spokane, Washington. He played high school football, basketball, and track for West Valley High School (Spokane, Washington).

College years 
Hanshaw graduated Brigham Young University with a degree in History He played for BYU football in the 1988, and 1991-1994 seasons. In 1988 Hanshaw played on the Junior Varsity team before he served as a missionary for the Church of Jesus Christ of Latter-day Saints in Stockholm, Sweden from 1989-1990 where towards the end of his missionary service he was almost killed in his living quarters. He was Redshirted in the 1991 season and then medically redshirted later in the 1991 season. He first started for the 1992 BYU Cougars football team as an offensive guard after another player's mid-season injury.

Professional career 
Tim Hanshaw was picked up in the 4th round of the NFL Draft as the 127th pick for the San Francisco 49ers. He played 30 games and started in 3.

Hanshaw participated in the Mormon Day ceremony hosted by the San Francisco Giants at Candlestick Park with Latter-day Saint teammates  Steve Young, Ty Detmer and Greg Clark.

Hanshaw's son Bentley served a two-year church mission in Australia and plays Tight End for BYU's football team.

References 

Living people
American football offensive guards
1970 births
Players of American football from Spokane, Washington
BYU Cougars football players
San Francisco 49ers players
American Mormon missionaries in Sweden